Petrovka is a rural locality (a selo) in Belgorodsky District, Belgorod Oblast, Russia. The population was 413 as of 2010. There are 5 streets.

References 

Rural localities in Belgorodsky District